Star Wars: Tales From a Galaxy Far, Far Away: Aliens: Volume 1 is a collection of six short stories written by Landry Q. Walker. The stories take place in the Star Wars Universe, set near the events of Star Wars: The Force Awakens. The book was published by Disney Lucasfilm Press in 2016.

Plot Summaries

Nigh Noon on Jakku
Constable Zuvio, the Constable of Niima Outpost, must get to the bottom of things when a trustworthy droid commits a bank robbery on a banking ship.

The Face of Evil
Two Frignosian cryptosurgeons on Takodana high in the tower of Maz Kanata's Castle must conduct a plastic surgery on a well-known criminal looking to hide her identity.

True Love
Two of Unkar Plutt's thugs plan on tricking him into giving them riches by programming a computer to steal his information through a dating site.

All Creatures Great and Small
Bobbajo the crittermonger tells a story how he was trapped on the Death Star while he and the citizens of Niima Outpost wait out an attack on their town.

A Recipe for Death
When his sous chef is found dead and his recipe book missing, the head chef at Maz Kanata's Castle must figure out who the culprit is through hosting a cooking contest for his staff.

The Crimson Corsair and the Lost Treasure of Count Dooku
Pirates, gangs, and bounty hunters all race to find Count Dooku's lost treasure on a desert planet far in the Outer Rim, and everyone will do whatever it takes to get their hands on it.

Publishing
This collection of short stories was published on April 5, 2016 by Disney Lucasfilm Press, an imprint of Disney Book Group. Its hardcover ISBN is 9781484741412.

Reception
According to Goodreads, the book has a 3.61/5, based on 526 ratings
Youtini rated this book 7.3/10
The Barnes & Noble community gave this book 5/5 stars, based on 1 review.
SanFransicoBookReview.com rated this book 4/5 stars

References 

Books based on Star Wars
2016 short story collections
American science fiction
American short story collections
Science fiction short story collections